Proteins currently known to belong to the Ni2+-Co2+ Transporter (NiCoT) family (TC# 2.A.52) can be found in organisms ranging from Gram-negative and Gram-positive bacteria to archaea and some eukaryotes. Members of this family catalyze uptake of Ni2+ and/or Co2+ in a proton motive force-dependent process.

Structure
These proteins range in size from about 300 to 400 amino acyl residues and possess 6, 7, or 8 transmembrane segments (TMSs), thought to result from an intragenic 4 TMS duplication, followed by a deletion of one or two TMSs in the cases of the 7 or 6 TMS proteins. Topological analyses with the HoxN Ni2+ transporter of Ralstonia eutropha (Alcaligenes eutrophus) suggest that it possesses 8 TMSs with its N- and C-termini in the cytoplasm. The Co2+ (Ni2+) transporter of Rhodococcus rhodochrous, NhlF, exhibits eight putative TMSs, and eight apparent TMSs are revealed by hydropathy analyses of multiple alignments of family protein sequences. An HX4DH motif in helix 2 of the HoxN protein has been implicated in Ni2+ binding, and both helix 1 and helix 2, which interact spatially, form the selectivity filter. In the Helicobacter pylori NixA homologue, several conserved motifs have been shown to be important for Ni2+ binding and transport.

Reaction
The overall reaction catalyzed by the proteins of the NiCoT family is:
[Ni2+ and/or Co2+] (out) → [Ni2+ and/or Co2+] (in).

Proteins
Several characterized proteins belong to the Ni2+-Co2+ Transporter (NiCoT) Family (TC# 2.A.43). A complete list of these proteins along with their transporter classification identification numbers (TCID), domain, kingdom/phylum, and some examples can be found in the Transporter Classification Database.

References

Further reading

 
 

Membrane proteins
Enzymes of known structure
Solute carrier family
Transmembrane proteins
Transmembrane transporters
Transport proteins